Anabelle Lee or similar may refer to:

People
Annabel Lee (musician), violinist
Annabelle Lee (1922–2008), American baseball pitcher

Songs
 "Annabel Lee", a song by Tiger Army from their 2001 album, Tiger Army II: Power of Moonlite (track #9)
 "Annabel Lee", a song by Lucyfire from their 2001 album This Dollar Saved My Life at Whitehorse
 "Annabel Lee", a song by Black Rebel Motorcycle Club from their 2010 album, Beat the Devil's Tattoo
 "Annabel Lee", a song by Stevie Nicks, adapted from Edgar Allan Poe, from her 2011 album, In Your Dreams
 "Anna Belle Lee", a song by Greg Kihn, on his 1989 album Kihnsolidation
 "Anna Belle Lee" aka. "Another New World", a song by Josh Ritter, on his 2010 album So Runs the World Away

Other
"Annabel Lee", a poem by Edgar Allan Poe
Annabell Lee (film), a film based on the poem by Edgar Allan Poe
 Annabelle Lee, character in The General (1926 film), played by Marion Mack

Lee, Anabelle